Christian Nicolay Keyser Brinch (15 August 1905  – 27 March 1979) was a Norwegian civil servant.

He was born in Kristiania to barrister Christian Nicolay Brinch and Anna Catharina Rolfsen, and was a brother of barrister and military officer Lorentz Brinch. He graduated as cand.jur. in 1928, was assigned with the Ministry of Finance from 1930, and with the Ministry of Trade from 1947. He served as Norway's alternate governor of the International Monetary Fund, and later of the World Bank.

He was decorated Commander of the Order of St. Olav in 1967, Commander of the Order of the Polar Star, and Commander of the Order of the Dannebrog.

References

1905 births
Year of death missing
Civil servants from Oslo
Norwegian expatriates in the United Kingdom
Commanders of the Order of the Polar Star
Commanders of the Order of the Dannebrog